"Waiting for the Robert E. Lee" is an American popular song written in 1912, with music by Lewis F. Muir and lyrics by L. Wolfe Gilbert. The "Robert E. Lee" in the title refers to the steamboat of that name.

Popular versions in 1912 were by the Heidelberg Quintet, Arthur Collins & Byron Harlan, and by Dolly Connolly.

It has since been recorded by such artists as Al Jolson, Benny Goodman, Judy Garland, Wayne Newton, Tennessee Ernie Ford, Louis Jordan, Dean Martin, Russ Conway, Chas and Dave, Neil Diamond, and Lizzie Miles.

in Alec Wilder's 1972 study, American Popular Song: The Great Innovators, 1900–1950, the songwriter and critic discusses "Waiting for the Robert E. Lee" as an early example of the evolution of American popular song and development of the Great American Songbook. Wilder asserts that with this song, "Muir caught the spirit of the new rhythms that had burst out with ragtime...This is a good song in any decade and remarkable for its time, certainly as much so as "Alexander's Ragtime Band."

The tune has been used with other words, for example in French "J'Ai Envie De Chanter" (not a translation), for example by Mireille Mathieu.

References

External links
 Sheet music for piano with lyrics, "IN Harmony: Sheet Music from Indiana University"
 Waiting For The Robert E. Lee by Jimmy Blade's Music
 WAITING FOR THE ROBERT E. LEE by BEN LIGHT with Instrumental Accompaniment
 "WAITING FOR THE ROBERT E. LEE" by BLAKE REYNOLDS
 Waiting for the Robert E. Lee by Heidelberg Quintette
 Waiting For The Robert E. Lee by Turk Murphy's Jazz Band
 Waiting for the Robert E. Lee by Abe's Rhythm Bones
 WAITING FOR THE ROBERT E. LEE by HERB KERN
 Waiting For The Robert E. Lee by Guy Lombardo And His Royal Canadians
 WAITING FOR THE ROBERT E. LEE by AL JOLSON
 "Waiting for the Robert E. Lee" by Victor Military Band
 WAITING FOR THE ROBERT E. LEE by DOLLY CONNOLLY
 WAITING FOR THE ROBERT E. LEE by Eddie "Piano" Miller
 Waiting For The Robert E. Lee by Lu Watters and his Yerba Buena Jazz Band
 WAITING FOR THE ROBERT E. LEE by GLEN STORY; JACK BARBOUR and his Rhythm Rustlers
 Waiting for the Robert E. Lee by Beatrice Kay and the Elm City Four
 WAITING FOR THE ROBERT E. LEE by Sophie Tucker
 Waiting For the Robert E. Lee by Guido Deiro
 Waiting for the Robert E. Lee by Dean Hudson And His Orchestra

Songs about boats
1912 songs
Rags
Songs written for films
Pop standards
American songs
Cultural depictions of Robert E. Lee
Songs written by L. Wolfe Gilbert